Usha Maurya is an Indian politician. She was elected to Husainganj in the 2022 Uttar Pradesh Legislative Assembly election as a member of the Samajwadi Party.

References

Living people
Year of birth missing (living people)
Uttar Pradesh MLAs 2022–2027
Women members of the Uttar Pradesh Legislative Assembly
Samajwadi Party politicians
21st-century Indian women politicians